Aradus parvicornis is a species of flat bugs in the family Aradidae. It is found in North America.

References

 Thomas J. Henry, Richard C. Froeschner. (1988). Catalog of the Heteroptera, True Bugs of Canada and the Continental United States. Brill Academic Publishers.

Further reading
 Arnett, Ross H. (2000). American Insects: A Handbook of the Insects of America North of Mexico. CRC Press.

External links
 NCBI Taxonomy Browser, Aradus parvicornis

Aradidae
Insects described in 1921